The British International School of Charlotte (BISC), formerly known as the "British American School" is a private non-sectarian, co-educational college preparatory day school located in the Ballantyne neighborhood in south Charlotte, North Carolina. BISC offers education for ages 18 months to 18 years old (Grade 12/UK (Year 13)). The school opened in September 2004 and was the fifth school opened in the United States by the British Schools of America. In 2013, BISC joined Nord Anglia Education, an international education provider with 66 international schools and over 50,000 students.

Curriculum

International Primary Curriculum (IPC) 
The British International School of Charlotte offers Primary School from Nursery to Grade 5 (18 months - Year 6) under the International Primary Curriculum (IPC). The International Primary Curriculum  is a thematic curriculum.

International Middle Years Curriculum (IMYC) 
BISC offers the International Middle-Years Curriculum (IMYC) which addresses the needs of Middle Years students in Grades 6 - 10 (Year 7 - Year 11).

The IMYC is a curriculum for students covering science, literacy, geography, history, art, PE, technology and Information and communications technology (ICT). It is organized into thematic units of work, each lasting for six weeks. Each unit is structured into discrete subjects.

Accreditations 

The British International School of Charlotte is accredited by the International Primary Curriculum and is a member of the Council of British International Schools (COBIS).  It is in its second year as an International Baccalaureate Candidate School.

References

British-American culture in North Carolina
Private middle schools in North Carolina
Private high schools in North Carolina
Private schools in North Carolina
Private elementary schools in North Carolina
Schools in Charlotte, North Carolina
Educational institutions established in 2004
Nord Anglia Education
2004 establishments in North Carolina